Fairyland is the land or home of the fairies.

Fairyland or Fairy Land may also refer to:

Other uses
 Fairyland: A Kingdom of Fairies, a 1903 French short silent adventure film
 Fairyland bamboo (Phyllostachys aurea), a bamboo species
 Fairyland (novel), a novel by science fiction writer Paul J. McAuley
 Fairyland (series), a 2011 novel series by Catherynne M. Valente
 Fairy-Land, an 1829 poem by Edgar Allan Poe
 Fairyland (horse)
 Fairyland (film), an upcoming coming-of-age drama

Places

Australia 
 Fairyland, Queensland, a locality in the Western Downs Region
 Fairyland, a now disused leisure park located in bushland in North Ryde, Sydney, Australia

South Africa 
 Fairyland, a suburb of the city of Paarl, South Africa

United States 
 Children's Fairyland, a small children's amusement park in Oakland, California, and also the first theme park in the United States
 Fairyland Park, a Missouri amusement park operating from 1923 to 1977
 Fairyland Pond (Concord, MA), Concord, Massachusetts

Music 
 "Fairy Land", a 1969 song by Donnie Sutherland, one of the first stereo singles recorded in Australia
 Fairyland (band), a French power metal band
 Fairyland (album), an album by Larry Coryell
 "Fairyland" (song), a 2005 song by J-Pop singer Ayumi Hamasaki

See also 
 Ferryland, Newfoundland and Labrador
 The Fairyland Story, a 1985 arcade game by Taito